In It to Win It is the eighth studio album by American rock band Saliva. It is the first album to feature singer Bobby Amaru, after Josey Scott left the band in 2012. The album was temporarily released via Rum Bum Records on September 3, 2013. The album is no longer available for purchase as the band rereleased the album as "Rise Up" features all of its songs except "Animal", "Flesh", and "I.D.N.A.E".

Track listing

Personnel
Bobby Amaru – lead vocals
Wayne Swinny – guitars, backing vocals
Dave Novotny – bass, backing vocals
Paul Crosby – drums

References

Saliva (band) albums
2013 albums